Bancroft is a township in Aroostook County, Maine, United States. The population was 57 at the 2020 census. On July 1, 2015 the town voted to deorganize and become part of the unorganized territory of South Aroostook.

Geography

Demographics

2010 census
As of the census of 2010, there were 68 people, 34 households, and 20 families living in the town. The racial makeup of the town was 100.0% White. Hispanic or Latino of any race were 2.9% of the population.

There were 34 households, of which 8.8% had children under the age of 18 living with them, 52.9% were married couples living together, 2.9% had a female householder with no husband present, 2.9% had a male householder with no wife present, and 41.2% were non-families. 41.2% of all households were made up of individuals, and 17.7% had someone living alone who was 65 years of age or older. The average household size was 2.00 and the average family size was 2.65.

The median age in the town was 55 years. 16.2% of residents were under the age of 18; 5.9% were between the ages of 18 and 24; 10.3% were from 25 to 44; 32.4% were from 45 to 64; and 35.3% were 65 years of age or older. The gender makeup of the town was 51.5% male and 48.5% female.

2000 census
As of the census of 2000, there were 61 people, 24 households, and 16 families living in the town. The population density was 1.5 people per square mile (0.6/km2). There were 82 housing units at an average density of 2.1 per square mile (0.8/km2). The racial makeup of the town was 100.00% White.

There were 24 households, out of which 29.2% had children under the age of 18 living with them, 45.8% were married couples living together, 12.5% had a female householder with no husband present, and 33.3% were non-families. 33.3% of all households were made up of individuals, and 16.7% had someone living alone who was 65 years of age or older. The average household size was 2.54 and the average family size was 3.25.

In the town the population was spread out, with 37.7% under the age of 18, 24.6% from 25 to 44, 24.6% from 45 to 64, and 13.1% who were 65 years of age or older. The median age was 40 years. For every 100 females, there were 103.3 males. For every 100 females age 18 and over, there were 100.0 males.

The median income for a household in the town was $16,250, and the median income for a family was $21,250. Males had a median income of $17,500 versus $18,750 for females. The per capita income for the town was $9,760. There were 8.3% of families and 17.5% of the population living below the poverty line, including 33.3% of under eighteens and none of those over 64.

References

Populated places in Aroostook County, Maine
Populated places disestablished in 2015
Former towns in Maine